Shang Salcedo Place is a residential building situated in Makati, Metro Manila, Philippines. It is located along Sen. Gil Puyat Avenue, Tordesillas and H. V. de la Costa Streets.

Location
The tower is situated along Sen. Gil Puyat Avenue, located at the Makati Central Business District, and a few blocks away from the Ayala Avenue, the Salcedo Park, the Carlos P. Romulo Auditorium, the Yuchengco Museum, the FEU Makati campus, the Mapúa University Makati and the Ateneo de Manila University, Salcedo Campus.

Architecture and design
Pimentel Rodriguez Simbulan and Partners were the architecture firm behind Shang Salcedo Place along with Wong and Tung International Ltd. Sy^2 + Associates was behind the structure of the building. J. P. Rapi (Philippines) Inc. was behind the MEP (mechanical, electrical, and plumbing) of the building.
Megawide Construction Corporation was the main contractor of the building.

References

See also
 List of tallest buildings in Metro Manila

Skyscrapers in Makati
Residential skyscrapers in Metro Manila
Residential buildings completed in 2017
21st-century architecture in the Philippines